The 2021–22 Mississippi State Bulldogs women's basketball team represented Mississippi State University during the 2021–22 NCAA Division I women's basketball season. The Bulldogs, led by first-year interim head coach Doug Novak, played their home games at Humphrey Coliseum and competed as members of the Southeastern Conference (SEC).

Previous season
The Bulldogs finished the season 10–9 (5–7 SEC) to finish in ninth place in the conference. Head coach Nikki McCray-Penson stepped down on October 12, 2021, due to health reasons.

Offseason

Departures

2021 recruiting class

Incoming transfers

Roster

Schedule

|-
!colspan=9 style=| Exhibition

|-
!colspan=9 style=| Non-conference regular season

|-
!colspan=9 style=| SEC regular season

|-
!colspan=9 style=| SEC Tournament

See also
2021–22 Mississippi State Bulldogs men's basketball team

References

Mississippi State Bulldogs women's basketball seasons
Mississippi State
Mississippi State Bulldogs
Mississippi State Bulldogs